The Conference USA men's basketball tournament is held annually following the end of the regular season of NCAA Division I Men's Basketball.

Format and hosts
After the conference realignment, the tournament was held at FedExForum in Memphis, Tennessee, for five seasons. It moved to the BOK Center in Tulsa, Oklahoma for the 2010, and then to El Paso, Texas, at the Don Haskins Center for 2011. It returned to FedExForum in 2012, and was set to be played there in 2013, as well. However, after Memphis' decision to leave Conference USA for what ultimately became the American Athletic Conference in 2013–14, the league decided to move the tournament to a site near a school remaining in the conference, ultimately selecting the BOK Center in Tulsa. The tournament returned to the Haskins Center in El Paso in 2014.  In 2015, the tournament moved to Birmingham, Alabama and the Legacy Arena for three years. Most recently, C-USA signed a deal with the NFL's Dallas Cowboys to move its men's and women's tournaments to the Ford Center, an indoor stadium at the Cowboys' headquarters in the Dallas suburb of Frisco, Texas. This deal, originally for the 2018 and 2019 tournaments, has since been extended through 2021.

Tournament results

 NCAA ruled that Memphis vacate wins from the 2007–2008 season.

Tournament Championships by School

Current members
Members as of July 1, 2022.

Former members
Former members that have won the tournament as of July 1, 2022.

 NCAA ruled that Memphis vacate wins from the 2007–2008 season.

Broadcasters

Television

Radio

See also
Conference USA women's basketball tournament

References

 
Recurring sporting events established in 1996